Komsomol may refer to:
 Komsomol, the former Communist Union of Youth in the Soviet Union
 Leninist Komsomol of the Russian Federation, the current youth organization of the Communist Party of the Russian Federation.

Places
 Komsomol, Beylagan, a village in Azerbaijan
 Komsomol, Salyan, a village in Azerbaijan
 Komsomol, Kazakhstan, a village in Kazakhstan
 Komsomol, Kyrgyzstan, a village in Kyrgyzstan
 Komsomol, Russia, a selo in Sheinsky Rural Okrug of Suntarsky District of the Sakha Republic
 Komsomolobod, Farkhor District a Jamoat in Tajikistan
Other
 K-3 Leninsky Komsomol, the first nuclear submarine of the Soviet Union.

See also
Komsomolets (disambiguation)
Komsomolsk (disambiguation)
Komsomolsky (disambiguation)